Haddon is a township in the Golden Plains Shire, 12 km west of Ballarat.

The most common responses for religion were No Religion 38.9%, Catholic 21.2% and Anglican 11.1%.

Haddon is home to Ballarat Kart Club, the original Haddon circuit was built in 1961, before being extended and widened  to its modern configuration.

Around 3 km of the Ballarat-Skipton Rail Trail passes through Haddon on the east side.

Amongst Haddon there is a Day Care Centre, a Kindergarten, a Primary School, a General store and the Haddon Fire Brigade.

River
Haddon is set on the Woady Yaloak River, which rises in some swamp land a few kilometres to the north. The river runs through paddocks, parks and under a road. The river has two bridges in the town, a footbridge in the park and a road bridge.

References

External links

Towns in Victoria (Australia)
Golden Plains Shire